Bunodophoron is a genus of lichen-forming fungi in the family Sphaerophoraceae.

Species
, Species Fungorum accepts 18 species of Bunodophoron:
Bunodophoron australe 
Bunodophoron coomerense 
Bunodophoron crespoae 
Bunodophoron diplotypum 
Bunodophoron flabellatum 
Bunodophoron flaccidum 
Bunodophoron formosanum 
Bunodophoron imshaugii 
Bunodophoron insigne 
Bunodophoron macrocarpum 
Bunodophoron melanocarpum 
Bunodophoron murrayi 
Bunodophoron notatum 
Bunodophoron patagonicum 
Bunodophoron pinnatum 
Bunodophoron ramuliferum 
Bunodophoron scrobiculatum 
Bunodophoron tibellii

References

Lecanorales
Lecanorales genera
Lichen genera
Taxa described in 1861
Taxa named by Abramo Bartolommeo Massalongo